Sibilia may refer to:

Enrico Sibilia (1861-1948), Italian Roman Catholic cardinal
Carlo Sibilia (born 1986), Italian politician
Sibilia, Quetzaltenango, a municipality in Guatemala
Sibilia, an Italian Navy corvette involved in the Tragedy of Otranto, a 1997 collision
, a Medieval Catalan name for the city of Seville, Spain

See also
Sibila of Fortia (died 1406), Queen of Aragon